Haagse Hockeyvereniging "Haagsche Delftsche Mixed", commonly known as hdm, is a Dutch field hockey club based in The Hague, South Holland.

The club was founded on 8 February 1908, when students from Delft wanted to play hockey with their girlfriends from The Hague. The first men's team won the Dutch national title in 1924, 1930, 1931, 1935, 1941, 1942 and – for the last time – in 1992. Currently, the first men's team competes in the Dutch second division, the Promotieklasse, the first women's team competes in the Dutch first division, the Hoofdklasse. 

In both the competitions 2020-2021 and 2021-2022 the first women's team succeeded to enter the play-offs for the Championship, but did not succeed to reach the finals.

On June 6th, 2022 the first men's team promoted back to the Dutch first division Hoofdklasse, after winning a play-offs trilogy (3-1) against SCHC [[Stichtsche Cricket en Hockey Club Bilthoven]].

Honours

Men
National title / Hoofdklasse
 Winners (8): 1923–24, 1929–30, 1930–31, 1934–35, 1935–36, 1940–41, 1941–42, 1991–92
 Runners-up (5): 1918–19, 1922–23, 1942–43, 1945–46, 1994–95
Gold Cup
 Runners-up (1): 2021–22
KNHB Cup
 Winners (2): 1994, 1995
EuroHockey Cup Winners Cup
 Runners-up (2): 1995, 1996
Hoofdklasse Indoor
 Winners (4): 1994–95, 2005–06, 2010–11, 2022–23
EuroHockey Indoor Club Cup
 Runners-up (1): 2012

Women
KNHB Gold Cup
 Runners-up (1): 2017–18
Hoofdklasse Indoor
 Winners (5): 1976–77, 1977–78, 1980–81, 1984–85, 2018–19
EuroHockey Indoor Club Cup
 Runners-up (1): 2020

Players

Current squad

Women's squad
Trainer-coach: Ivar Knotschke

Notable internationals from HDM

 Carina Benninga
 Marc Benninga
 Wendy Fortuin
 Russell Garcia
 Julian Halls
 Nicole Koolen
 Martine Ohr
 Wouter van Pelt
 Koen Pijpers
 Hanneke Smabers
 Minke Smabers
 Macha van der Vaart
 Ingrid Wolff
 Giselle Kañevsky

References

 
Dutch field hockey clubs
Field hockey clubs established in 1908
1908 establishments in the Netherlands
Sports clubs in The Hague